1st Class is the second full-length album that Large Professor released in 2002.  It has a guest appearance from Large Professor's longtime friend Nas as well as Busta Rhymes, Akinyele and Q-Tip.

Track listing
All tracks produced by Large Professor, except where noted 
 "Intro"
 "'Bout that Time"
 "Ultimate"
 "Brand New"
 "Stay Chisel" (feat. Nas) *
 "Akinyele (Live at the BBQ Pt. 2)" (feat. Akinyele)
 "In the Sun" (feat. Q-Tip); produced by Xplicit
 "Born to Ball"
 "Kool"; produced by J-Love
 "The Man"
 "Large Pro"
 "Alive in Stereo"; produced by Hill Inc.
 "Blaze Rhymez II"
 "On" (feat. Busta Rhymes)
 "Hip Hop"
 "Radioactive"
 "Back To Back (Bonus)"

Charts

References

2002 albums
Large Professor albums
Matador Records albums
Albums produced by Large Professor